Mikhail Pavlovich Lisitsa (Михаил Павлович Лисица; 1921–2012) was a Ukrainian physicist. The asteroid 8064 Lisitsa was named after him.

References

1921 births
2012 deaths
20th-century Ukrainian physicists
Soviet physicists
Laureates of the State Prize of Ukraine in Science and Technology